The 1993 Vancouver municipal election was held on November 21, 1993, the same day as other municipalities and regional districts in British Columbia selected their new municipal governments. Voters elected a mayor, 10 city councillors, 7 park board commissioners, and 9 school board trustees through plurality-at-large voting.

Candidates and results

Parties

Four parties fielded candidates for election in the 1993 election.

Mayor

Bob Seeman, a 30-year-old lawyer, was the first major candidate to announce a bid for the office of mayor, and began campaigning in August. Characterized in the media as following in the footsteps of Ross Perot, Seeman described himself as "fiscally right wing" and "environmentally left wing". Seeman noted in a Vancouver Sun op-ed that he was concerned about the merger of COPE and the Civic New Democrats, accusing politicians of being bought by "unions and big business", and praising the upstart National and Reform parties. Near the end of the campaign, Seeman "crashed" a debate held by the CBC at the Vancouver East Cultural Centre between Owen and Davies, taking the stage and demanding to be included. This was met with boos from the audience, to which Seeman responded by asking all those who wished him to leave to raise their hands. The crowd overwhelmingly supported his exclusion, to which Seeman responded with, "Thank you for treating me a second-class candidate," while being heckled by the audience.

In mid-August, the NPA board and councillors announced they had rallied around three-term councillor Philip Owen to succeed outgoing mayor Gordon Campbell. Owen had extensive political experience, running for council in 1976, 1980, 1982, and 1984, as well as standing unsuccessfully as a provincial Social Credit candidate in 1983 and serving on the Vancouver Parks Board from 1978 to 1980. Owen, a member of an evangelical congregation within the Anglican Church of Canada, came under fire for his nods to voters on the Christian right, such as indicating he drew inspiration from Chuck Colson and for lengthy profiles in right-wing Christian publications. Lauded for his transparency and commitment to accountability, Owen's campaign focused on supporting business and opposing property tax increases and excessive spending on the part of the civic government.

In the wake of the Civic NDP and Committee of Progressive Electors merger, the new Coalition of Progressive Electors nominated five-term councillor Libby Davies for the mayor's chair. Davies had ruminated on a potential run for months and announced her intentions in early September. Criticized in the media for a lack of charisma, even Davies' opponents noted her down-to-earth likeability and her knowledgeable nature. Davies' campaign focused on creating ward boundaries, a more regional focus for planning and transportation issues, and a desire to fix what she saw as Vancouver's looming housing crisis. 

An independent candidate, Angus Macdonald, ran to show that anyone could participate in the electoral process and advocate for their community.

City councillors

Party standings in City Council

Park Board commissioners
Top 7 candidates elected

Party standings in Park Board

School Board trustees
Top 9 candidates elected

Party standings in School Board

References

Vancouver municipal election
Municipal elections in Vancouver
Vancouver municipal election
Municipal election, 1993
Vancouver municipal election